The Automotive Hall of Fame is a hall of fame and museum honoring famous and influential figures in the history of the automotive industry. Located in Dearborn, Michigan, a suburb of Detroit, the Hall of Fame is part of the MotorCities National Heritage Area.

History
The Automotive Hall of Fame was founded on October 18, 1939, in New York City by a group called the "Automobile Old Timers." Its original mission was to perpetuate the memories of early automotive pioneers and to honor people from all parts of the auto industry worldwide. For its first three decades, The Automotive Hall of Fame had four name changes. Its second iteration was "Automotive Old Timers" adopted in 1957 and intended to recognize its broader base, including automotive-related industries. In 1971 it became "The Automotive Organization Team." Finally, it became known as "The Automotive Hall of Fame" and that resulted in greater growth.

In 1946 the hall worked with the "National Golden Jubilee" (50th anniversary of the creation of the automobile). As General William S. Knudsen stated, the selection to the Hall of Fame included "Ten pioneers whose engineering and administrative genius made possible the present day." The selection was done in cooperation with the Automobile Manufacturers Association, the "National Automotive Golden Jubilee committee of which Knudsen was president. Edgar Apperson, William Crapo Durant, J. Frank Duryea, Henry Ford, George M. Holley, Charles B. King, Charles W. Nash, Barney Oldfield, Ransom E. Olds, and Alfred P. Sloan Jr. were selected.

The organization moved to Washington, D.C. in 1960, sharing space in the National Automobile Dealers Association building. In 1971, it moved to Midland, Michigan, where it got its first home at Northwood University. In 1997, it moved to its present home, a 25,000-square-foot building in Dearborn, Michigan, adjacent to The Henry Ford; in addition to automobile history artifacts, it contains a small theater and a central enclosed building area for public events, meetings and other exhibits.

The Hall celebrated its 75th anniversary in 2014.

During the 2016 induction ceremony, the Hall of Fame's president announced that the museum was exploring a possible move to downtown Detroit. These plans never materialized.

Awards
The Hall honors members of the automotive industry each year. There were 271 people inducted into the Automotive Hall of Fame through 2016. These inductees include the founders of Benz, Bosch, Bugatti, Buick, Chevrolet, Chrysler, Citroen, Cord, Daimler, Dodge, Duesenberg, Durant, Duryea, Ferrari, Ford, Honda, Maybach, Olds, Peugeot, Porsche, Renault and Toyota among others.

Along with the Hall of Fame induction awards, the Hall also honors individuals with three other significant awards each year:
Distinguished Service Citation
Industry Leader of the Year Award
Young Leader and Excellence Award
For Hall induction, the Distinguished Service Citation, and Young Leader and Excellence Award, anyone can submit a nomination by filling out the form or sending a letter, along with reference materials that may assist the Awards Committee. The Industry Leader of the Year Award is nominated and awarded solely by the Awards Committee, so no external nominations are accepted.

Inductees 

 Giovanni Agnelli
 O. Donovan Allen
 John W. Anderson
 Robert Anderson
 Mario Andretti
 Zora Arkus-Duntov
 Edgar Apperson
 Clarence W. Avery
 Warren E. Avis
 Robert Bamford
 Béla Barényi
 Vincent Bendix
 W.O. Bentley
 Bertha Benz
 Karl Benz
 Nuccio Bertone
 Nils Bohlin
 Alberto Bombassei
 Robert Bosch
 Charles A. Bott
 Ernest R. Breech
 Allen K. Breed
 Craig Breedlove
 Carl Breer
 Edward G. Budd
 Gordon M. Buehrig
 Ettore Bugatti
 David D. Buick
 Philip Caldwell
 Richard D. Caleal
 Frank J. Campbell
 Michael Cardone
 Walter F. Carey
 Francois J. Castaing
 Albert C. Champion
 Roy D. Chapin His son Roy D. Chapin Jr. was inducted into the Automotive Hall of Fame in 1984 and his grandson, William R. Chapin, was named president of the Automotive Hall of Fame in 2010.
 Roy D. Chapin Jr.
 Louis Chevrolet
 Walter P. Chrysler
 André Citroën
 J. Harwood Cochrane
 David E. Cole 
 Edward N. Cole
 Archie T. Colwell 
 Errett L. Cord
 James J. Couzens
 Keith E. Crain
 Frederick C. Crawford
 Lewis M. Crosley
 Powel Crosley Jr.
 Clessie L. Cummins
 Harlow H. Curtice
 Gottlieb Daimler
 Charles A. Dana
 Howard A. "Dutch" Darrin
 Richard E. Dauch
 Edward "Ed" Davis
 Ralph De Palma
 Joseph R. Degnan
 W. Edwards Deming
 Rudolf Diesel
 Arthur O. Dietz
 Abner Doble
 Horace E. Dodge
 John F. Dodge
 Frederic G. Donner
 Harold D. Draper
 Fred Duesenberg
 John B. Dunlop
 William C. Durant
 Charles E. Duryea
 J. Frank Duryea
 Harley J. Earl
 Dale Earnhardt
 Joseph O. Eaton
 John E. Echlin
 Thomas A. Edison
 Elliott M. Estes
 Henry T. Ewald
 Virgil M. Exner
 Battista Farina
 Jim Farley
 Enzo Ferrari
 Harvey S. Firestone
 Harvey S. Firestone Jr.
 Alfred J. Fisher
 Carl G. Fisher
 Charles T. Fisher
 Edward F. Fisher
 Fred J. Fisher
 Howard A. Fisher
 Lawrence P. Fisher
 William A. Fisher
 Walter E. Flanders
 Edsel B. Ford
 Henry Ford
 Henry Ford II
 A.J. Foyt
 Bill France
 Bill France Jr.
 Herbert H. Franklin
 Carlyle Fraser
 Douglas A. Fraser
 Joseph Frazer
 Martin Fromm
 Thomas N. Frost
 August Fruehauf
 Thomas C. Gale
 Paul Galvin
 Robert W. Galvin
 Don Garlits
 Joe Girard
 John E. Goerlich
 Martin E. Goldman
 Andy Granatelli
 Richard H. Grant
 Alma Green
 Victor Green
 Giorgetto Giugiaro
 Lu Guanqiu
 Dan Gurney
 Janet Guthrie
 Zenon C.R. Hansen
 Elwood Haynes
 Donald Healey
 J.E. Henry
 Phil Hill
 Maximilian E. Hoffman
 William E. Holler
 Earl Holley
 George M. Holley Sr.
 Soichiro Honda
 August Horch
 H. Wayne Huizenga
 Anton Hulman Jr.
 Lee Hunter
 J.R. Hyde III
 Lee Iacocca
 Robert W. Irvin
 Shojiro Ishibashi
 Alec Issigonis
 Mike Jackson
 Thomas B. Jeffery
 Fred Jones
 Charles M."Chuck" Jordan
 Edward S. "Ned" Jordan
 Henry B. Joy
 Albert Kahn
 Henry J. Kaiser
 Wunibald I. Kamm
 Yutaka Katayama
 K.T. Keller
 Frank D. Kent
 Charles F. Kettering
 Charles B. King
 William S. Knudsen
 John W. Koons
 Eberhard von Kuenheim
 Ferruccio Lamborghini
 Edward C. Larson
 Elliot Lehman
 Henry M. Leland
 Jay Leno
 Paul W. Litchfield
 Raymond Loewy
 Wilton D. Looney
 J. Edward Lundy
 Roy Lunn
 Robert A. Lutz
 Sir William Lyons
 John M. Mack
 Ray Magliozzi
 Tom Magliozzi
 Sergio Marchionne
 Lionel Martin
 Wilhelm Maybach
 Frank E. McCarthy
 Denise McCluggage
 Robert B. McCurry
 Brouwer D. McIntyre
 Robert S. McLaughlin
 Robert S. McNamara
 Rene C. McPherson
 William E. Metzger
 André Michelin
 Edouard Michelin
 Arjay Miller
 Harry A. Miller
 William L. Mitchell
 Luca di Montezemolo
 Hubert Moog
 Jim Moran
 Southwood "Woody" Morcott
 Charles S. Mott
 Alan Mulally
 Shirley Muldowney
 Thomas Murphy
 Ralph Nader
 Charles W. Nash
 Henry J. Nave
 Joseph Henry Nook, Sr.
 Heinrich Nordhoff
 Taiichi Ohno
 Barney Oldfield
 Ransom E. Olds
 Rodney O'Neal
 Carl Opel
 Friedrich Opel

 Heinrich Opel
 Ludwig Opel
 Wilhelm Opel
 Nikolaus A. Otto
 James Ward Packard
 William Doud Packard
 Wally Parks
 Roger Penske
 Thomas S. Perry
 Donald Petersen
 Richard Petty
 Armand Peugeot
 Ferdinand Piech
 Charles M. Pigott
 Charles J. Pilliod
 Sergio Pininfarina
 Harold A. Poling
 Ralph Lane Polk
 Ferdinand Porsche
 J. David Power III
 Heinz C. Prechter
 William A. Raftery
 Alice Huyler Ramsey
 Louis Renault
 Walter P. Reuther
 Edward V. Rickenbacker
 James M. Roche
 Willard F. Rockwell Sr.
 George W. Romney
 Helene Rother
 Jack Roush
 Frederick Henry Royce
 Patrick Ryan
 James A. Ryder
 Bruno Sacco
 George N. Schuster
 Mort Schwartz
 Louis Schwitzer
 Kenneth W. Self
 Amnon Shashua
 Wilbur Shaw
 Carroll H. Shelby
 Owen R. Skelton
 Alfred P. Sloan Jr.
 Arthur O. Smith
 Lloyd R. Smith
 John F. Smith Jr.
 Charles E. Sorensen
 Hal Sperlich
 Clarence W. Spicer
 Francis E. Stanley
 Freelan O. Stanley
 Sir Jackie Stewart
 Lyn St. James
 Walter W. Stillman
 John W. Stokes
 William B. Stout
 Robert A. Stranahan, Sr.
 Frank Stronach
 John M. Studebaker
 Harry C. Stutz
 Genichi Taguchi
 Ratan N. Tata
 Walter C. Teagle
 Ralph R. Teetor
 John J. Telnack
 Mickey Thompson
 Henry M. Timken
 Eiji Toyoda
 Kiichiro Toyoda
 Shoichiro Toyoda
 Alex Tremulis
 Preston Tucker
 Edwin J. Umphrey
 Jesse G. Vincent
 Roy Warshawsky
 Elmer H. Wavering
 Edward T. Welburn
 J. Irving Whalley
 Rollin H. White
 Walter C. White
 Windsor T. White
 John L. Wiggins
 C. Harold Wills
 John N. Willys
 Charles E. Wilson
 Alexander Winton
 Jiro Yanase
 Fred M. Young
  Frederick M. Zeder
 Ferdinand Graf von Zeppelin
 Chung Mong-koo

Other similar institutions
In 2001 the European Automotive Hall of Fame was established and inducted its first class of 13 members. Permanent plaques of honor will be emplaced at Palexpo, the home of the Geneva Auto Show.

See also
 List of motor vehicle awards

Citations

External links

Motor vehicle halls of fame
Automobile museums in Michigan
Culture of Detroit
Automobile culture and history in Dearborn, Michigan
Halls of fame in Michigan
Museums in Wayne County, Michigan
MotorCities National Heritage Area
Museums established in 1939
1939 establishments in New York City
Awards established in 1939